Kenza Allaoui (born 2 November 1999) is a French-born Moroccan footballer who plays as a midfielder for Division 2 Féminine club VGA Saint-Maur and the Morocco women's national team.

Early life
Allaoui was born in Vitry-sur-Seine.

Club career
Allaoui has played for US Orléans, Troyes AC and Saint-Maur in France.

International career
Allaoui made her senior debut for Morocco on 30 November 2020.

See also
List of Morocco women's international footballers

References

1999 births
Living people
Citizens of Morocco through descent
Moroccan women's footballers
Women's association football midfielders
Morocco women's international footballers
People from Vitry-sur-Seine
Footballers from Val-de-Marne
French women's footballers
Paris Saint-Germain Féminine players
ES Troyes AC players
French sportspeople of Moroccan descent